Tiszavasvári is a town in Szabolcs-Szatmár-Bereg county, in the Northern Great Plain region of eastern Hungary.

History

The settlement of Tiszavasvári was created in 1941 by merging the former independent settlements of Tiszabűd and Szentmihály under the name of Bűdszentmihály. The villagers of Tiszabűd opposed the merger and the two communities were separated in 1946 but only for four years. In 1950 the two settlements were again merged. The name of the locality was changed to Tiszavasvári in 1952 in memory of Pál Vasvári, a Hungarian writer and participant in the Hungarian Revolution of 1848.

Geography

Twin towns – sister cities

Tiszavasvári is twinned with:
 Baia Sprie, Romania
 Izvoru Crișului, Romania
 Livada, Romania
 Șimleu Silvaniei, Romania

See also
Váci Mihály Gimnázium

References

Populated places in Szabolcs-Szatmár-Bereg County